Liu Hongyu (born January 11, 1975, in Liaoning) is a female Chinese race walker.

Achievements

See also
China at the World Championships in Athletics

External links
 
 
 

1975 births
Living people
Beijing International Studies University people
Athletes (track and field) at the 1998 Asian Games
Athletes (track and field) at the 2000 Summer Olympics
Chinese female racewalkers
Olympic athletes of China
Athletes from Liaoning
World record setters in athletics (track and field)
Asian Games medalists in athletics (track and field)
World Athletics Championships medalists
Asian Games gold medalists for China
Medalists at the 1998 Asian Games
World Athletics Race Walking Team Championships winners
World Athletics Championships winners